Jhornan José Zamora Mota (born 30 January 1989) is a Venezuelan-Spanish basketball player who plays in the shooting guard position for Venezuela and currently plays for Titanes de Barranquilla. He also holds Spanish citizenship as he previously played for various Spanish clubs including CB Valladolid, CB Axarquía, Clinicas Rincon, Palencia and Club Ourense Baloncesto. Jhornan was part of the Venezuelan squad during the 2019 FIBA Basketball World Cup, where the team ended up at 14th position.

Club career 
He started his career as a youngster for CB Valladolid in 2004 and played for the side until 2009. On 19 September 2015, he joined the Spanish Club Ourense Baloncesto for one-year contract and later renewed the contract with it in 2017–19 season. In July 2019, he left the Club Ourense and signed with French club ALM Évreux Basket.

In November 2022, Zamora joined the Titanes de Barranquilla in Colombia.

References

External links
 RealGM profile

1989 births
Living people
ALM Évreux Basket players
Baloncesto Málaga players
Basketball players at the 2015 Pan American Games
Basketball players at the 2019 Pan American Games
CB Valladolid players
Club Ourense Baloncesto players
Palencia Baloncesto players
Pan American Games competitors for Venezuela
Shooting guards
Sportspeople from Caracas
Trotamundos B.B.C. players
Venezuelan expatriate basketball people in Chile
Venezuelan expatriate basketball people in Colombia
Venezuelan expatriate basketball people in France
Venezuelan expatriate basketball people in Spain
Venezuelan men's basketball players
2019 FIBA Basketball World Cup players

Titanes de Barranquilla players